United Nations Security Council resolution 835, adopted unanimously on 2 June 1993, after recalling resolutions 668 (1990), 745 (1992), 810 (1993), 826 (1993) and other relevant resolutions, the council expressed appreciation for the United Nations Transitional Authority in Cambodia (UNTAC) in the aftermath of recent elections in Cambodia.

The council went on to commend the efforts of Yasushi Akashi, the special representative of the Secretary-General Boutros Boutros-Ghali in Cambodia for providing support despite the hardships and difficulties experienced. It also paid tribute to the then King of Cambodia Norodom Sihanouk for his leadership of the Supreme National Council and to the number of Cambodians who exercised their vote, further endorsing the view that the elections were free and fair.

Inviting the secretary-general to make his report available as soon as possible on the conduct of the elections, the council announced its intention to support the newly elected constituent assembly in forming a new government and drawing up a constitution. All parties were urged to respect the results of the elections after some discontent amongst the political parties, and to do all in their power to bring about the peaceful establishment of a democratic government. Finally, the international community was urged to contribute to the reconstruction and rehabilitation of Cambodia.

See also
 List of United Nations Security Council Resolutions 801 to 900 (1993–1994)
 Modern Cambodia
 Transition of the People's Republic of Kampuchea to Cambodia

References

External links
 
Text of the Resolution at undocs.org

 0835
20th century in Cambodia
Political history of Cambodia
 0835
June 1993 events
1993 in Cambodia